Layou may refer to:

 Layou, a town on the island of Saint Vincent in Saint Vincent and the Grenadines
 Layou River, a river in Dominica
 Layou, Dominica, a village in Dominica